Charie Van Dyke (born December 10, 1965) is a former actor and model, the current president and co-owner of New Image College of Fine Arts, and a producer, known for The Clean-Up (2014), Famine (2011), and Star Vehicle (film) (2010).

Personal life
Van Dyke was born in Winnipeg, Manitoba. At a young age, she followed her parents, Charlotte and Bill, to Los Angeles, California, where she continued her high school education. During this time, she was an avid athlete and became an All-American in track and field. After high school, she developed her interest and love for modelling and acting, which allowed her to travel across the world. In her mid-twenties, she settled back down in Vancouver and took over her parents business.

Career
Van Dyke was a model when her parents, both psychologists, started New Image College of Fine Arts, back then known as New Image Enterprises, in 1980. At that time, New Image was a school for self-improvement. In 1988, Van Dyke took over when her mother left to care for her father after he suffered a debilitating injury. Under her ownership, the school was changed, restructured and made it into a school where acting programs, professional makeup, and professional skin care were taught. Soon after, Van Dyke met her husband and the current co-owner of New Image, John Craig. Together, in 2004, the two went through accreditation and moved the school to their current Downtown Vancouver location. As their college grew larger, Van Dyke, with the help of her husband, founded New Image Entertainment in order to create more opportunities for the graduates of their college. Recently, in 2014, New Image Entertainment, under the leadership of John Craig, was hired by an outside source for a professional production, not connected to the college.

Filmography

References 

1965 births
Living people
Actresses from Los Angeles
Actresses from Vancouver
Actresses from Winnipeg
Female models from British Columbia
Film producers from British Columbia
Canadian women film producers
21st-century American women